Sun Yat Sen Park is an urban park in Nossa Senhora de Fátima, Macau, China. The park is named for the founding father of the Republic of China, Dr Sun Yat Sen. 

The park is a 70,000 square meters (17.3 acres) urban park located in northern Macau in Our Lady of Fatima Parish along the border with Zhuhai, Mainland China. The park is located next to Canal dos Patos, but access to the former canal is closed off, and Barrier Gate. It was originally called Canal dos Patos Park to commemorate the friendship between China and Portugal in 1987. The park is one of forty three parks in the world to bear this name.

The park features:
 old gate that marked the entrance to Macau from the mainland
 aviary
 Victorian greenhouse
 flower gardens
 feng shui forest
 swimming pool
 playground
 multi use sports fields

Public library
The Macao Public Library Wong Ieng Kuan Library in Dr. Sun Yat-Sen Municipal Park occupies  of space in a former restaurant in the park. One of several created with funding by Chinese Peruvian Wong Ieng Kuan (黃營均), it opened in a separate building in the park in 1996 and moved to its current building on 24 January 2014.

See also
Zhongshan Park

References

External links

 Sun Yat Sen Park, Macau
 Dr. Sun Yat Sen Municipal Park in Sun Yat-sen Parks in the World, publicly accessible with info on 106 parks, provided by Hong Kong Baptist University Library

Urban public parks in Macau
Gardens in Macau
Monuments and memorials to Sun Yat-sen